Raigo is an Estonian masculine given name and may refer to:

Raigo Mõlder (born 1982), Estonian rally co-driver
Raigo Toompuu (born 1981), Estonian track and field athlete

References

Estonian masculine given names